Charles Bacon House is a historic home located at Louisiana, Pike County, Missouri. It was built about 1850, and is a -story, five bay, vernacular Greek Revival style brick dwelling.  It sits on a stone foundation and features a two-story wood front porch.

It was listed on the National Register of Historic Places in 1990.

References

Houses on the National Register of Historic Places in Missouri
Greek Revival houses in Missouri
Houses completed in 1850
Buildings and structures in Pike County, Missouri
National Register of Historic Places in Pike County, Missouri
1850 establishments in Missouri